The Bisei Spaceguard Center (BSGC) is an astronomical observatory located at Bisei-chō, Okayama, Japan. BATTeRS has discovered numerous minor planets and the periodic, Halley-type comet and near-Earth object C/2001 W2 (BATTERS).

Space debris, along with defunct spaceships, satellites as well as other small objects can present a hazard to operating spacecraft. Built by the Japan Space Forum (JSF) with contributions by the Japanese Ministry of Education, Culture, Sports, Science and Technology, all expenses of the center are covered by the Japan Aerospace Exploration Agency (JAXA). The telescopes which keep track of any space debris are staffed and operated by members of the Japan Spaceguard Association. Besides the spaceguard center, the facility also includes the Bisei Astronomical Observatory (BAO).

The 1-meter Cassegrain telescope has a field of view of three degrees and there are plans to use a mosaic of ten CCD detectors each one of which will have dimensions of 2096 x 4096 pixels. A 0.5-meter telescope with a field of view of 2 x 2 degrees began operations in February 2000. Once the 1-meter NEO search telescope begins operations, the 0.5-meter telescope will be used to provide follow-up astrometric observations.

The main-belt asteroid 17286 Bisei, discovered by BATTeRS in July 2000, was named after the town where the Bisei Spaceguard Center and the Bisei Astronomical Observatory are located.

List of discovered minor planets 

BATTeRS has discovered more than 400 minor planets during its course. Members of the program include Atsuo Asami, David J. Asher and Syuichi Nakano. Takeshi Urata was also a former member of BATTerS.

See also 
 Japan Spaceguard Association

References

External links 
 Official website 
 BATTeRS (プロジェクト) 
 Japan Spaceguard Association

Astronomical surveys
Asteroid surveys

Minor-planet discovering observatories